KPV (or Kokkolan Palloveikot) is a Finnish football club, based in Kokkola. It currently plays in the Finnish First Division (Ykkönen). The club's head coach is Christian Sund, and it plays its home matches at Kokkolan keskuskenttä.

History
KPV is the club of Finnish-speaking people in the town. The rival club is Swedish-speaking GBK.

KPV run a number of team including 1 men's teams, 1 ladies team, 10 boys team and 7 girls teams.  The club also runs an Academy and Soccer School.

Domestic history

European history

Current squad
Updated 1 January 2022.

Out on loan

Former players
For a complete list of former Kokkolan Palloveikot players with Wikipedia articles, see :Category:Kokkolan Palloveikot players.

Management and boardroom

Management
As of 17 April 2019

Boardroom
As of 17 April 2019

Honours
Finnish championship (league format): 1969
Finnish championship (league format) 2nd: 1973
Finnish championship (league format) 3rd: 1971, 1975, 2005
Finnish Cup finalist: 1982, 2006

References and sources

 Official Website
 KPV Juniors Website
 Finnish Wikipedia
 Suomen Cup
 KPV Facebook

Footnotes

Football clubs in Finland
1930 establishments in Finland
Association football clubs established in 1930